Agama rueppelli, commonly known as the arboreal agama or Rüppell's agama, is a species of lizard in the family Agamidae. The species is endemic to East Africa.

Etymology
The specific name, rueppelli, and one of the common names, Rüppell's agama, are in honor of German naturalist Eduard Rüppell.

Geographic range
A. rueppelli is found in eastern Ethiopia, northern Kenya, and Somalia.

Description
It has darker crossbars down the back, with a pale vertebral stripe.

References

External links

Further reading
Boulenger GA (1885). Catalogue of the Lizards in the British Museum (Natural History). Second Edition. Volume I. ... Agamidæ. London: Trustees of the British Museum (Natural History). (Taylor and Francis, printers). xii + 436 pp. + Plates I-XXXII. ("Agama rueppellii [sic]", pp. 355–356).
Parker HW (1932). "Scientific Results of the Cambridge Expedition to the East African Lakes, 1930-31. 5. Reptiles and Amphibians". Journal of the  Linnean Society of London, Zoology 38: 213-229.
Vaillant L (1882). "Reptiles et Batraciens ". pp. 1–25 + Plates I-III. In: Révoil G (1882). Faune et Flore des Pays Çomalis (Afrique Orientale). Paris: Challanel Ainé. 530 pp. ("Agama ruppelli [sic]", new species, pp. 6–8 + Plate I). (in French).

rueppelli
Agamid lizards of Africa
Reptiles of Kenya
Reptiles described in 1882
Taxa named by Léon Vaillant